Argia emma, or Emma's dancer, is a species of narrow-winged damselfly in the family Coenagrionidae. It is found in North America.

The IUCN conservation status of Argia emma is "LC", least concern, with no immediate threat to the species' survival. The population is stable.

References

Further reading

 

Coenagrionidae
Articles created by Qbugbot
Insects described in 1915